Clare Hastings is a British author, and a former fashion journalist, stylist and costume designer.

Early life
She is the daughter of Macdonald Hastings and Anne Scott-James, and sister to Max Hastings.

Career
Hastings worked for over 30 years as a fashion journalist, stylist and costume designer. She started her career as assistant to Anna Wintour at Harpers and Queen magazine.

Her book, The House in Little Chelsea, is about the history of an 1873 house in Finborough Road, London, that she bought in 1984, and has lived in ever since. Margaret Drabble "greatly enjoyed" it, and called it "very well done".

Personal life
Hastings has lived with her partner Nick Llewellyn for over 30 years. She lives in London, and spends her weekends at her cottage in Berkshire. She has a daughter, Calypso Rose, who is director of the experiences company The Indytute.

Publications
Gardening Notes from a Late Bloomer, Pimpernel Press, 2018
The House in Little Chelsea , Pimpernel Press, 2018, 
Hold The Front Page!, Pimpernel Press, 2020

References

External links

Living people
British non-fiction writers
21st-century English writers
Year of birth missing (living people)